Anna Bederke (born 1981) is a German actress. She has appeared in more than ten films since 2009.

Selected filmography

References

External links 

1981 births
Living people
German film actresses